Alioune Kébé (born 24 November 1984) is a former Senegalese football striker.

Kebe is since August 2008 owner of the senegalese club Mayacine Foot Centre.

References

1984 births
Living people
Senegalese footballers
Le Mans FC players
Tours FC players
Royal Excel Mouscron players
FC Gueugnon players
Paris FC players
Ligue 2 players
Danish Superliga players
AC Horsens players
Entente SSG players
Association football forwards